Sri Bannari Amman is a 2002 Tamil-language devotional film written and directed by Bharathi Kannan. The film featured Vijayashanti in the title role being her 175th project alongside Karan and Laya, while Vadivelu plays a supporting role. The film, which had music composed by T. Rajendar, released in April 2002.

Cast
Vijayashanti as Sri Bannari Amman
Karan as Vaanamaalai
Laya as Bhavani
Vadivelu as Kozhakatta Govindan
Rajan P. Dev
Singamuthu
Khushbu as a dancer(kutram enna song)
Sukanya as a dancer (athi shivan song)
Nalini in a special appearance (atharvana bhatirakali devotee) 
King kong as Govindan's partner
Kullamani as Govindan's partner
Bonda Mani as Govindan's partner

Production
While marketing the film, the producers featured Sukanya, as well as Khushboo, who appear only in songs, as a selling point in the posters.

Soundtrack
The music was composed by Vijaya T. Rajendar.

Release
The film opened to average reviews, with a critic from The Hindu noting "if only one story had been woven into a nice screenplay, it would have sustained the tempo. A couple of small stories narrated in the film make the main story line weak.". BBThots wrote it "doesn't offer anything new or different from the other Amman movies". Screen wrote "Actually it seems that the director is more confused on whether to cash in on Vijayshanthi’s image or go in for more of the unusual stuff".

The film was later dubbed and released in Telugu as Maha Chandi.

References

2002 films
Hindu devotional films
2000s Tamil-language films
Films directed by Bharathi Kannan